Madras State was a state of India during the mid-20th century. At the time of its formation in 1950, it included the whole of present-day Tamil Nadu (except Kanyakumari district), Coastal Andhra, Rayalaseema, the Malabar region of North and central Kerala, Bellary, South Canara and Kollegal. Coastal Andhra and Rayalaseema were separated to form Andhra State in 1953, while South Canara and Bellary districts along with the Kollegalam taluka of Coimbatore district were merged with Mysore State, and Malabar District with the State of Travancore-Cochin to form Kerala in 1956. Post State Reorganization in 1956, the remaining Madras State was renamed to Tamil Nadu on January 14, 1969.

History 
After Indian Independence, the Madras Presidency became the Madras Province on 15 August 1947. On 26 January 1950, it was formed as Madras State by the Government of India. As a result of the 1956 States Reorganisation Act, the state's boundaries were re-organized following linguistic lines. The state was finally renamed Tamil Nadu on 14 January 1969 by then Chief Minister C. N. Annadurai.

Chief Ministers

O. P. Ramaswamy Reddiyar
At the time of Independence, O. P. Ramaswamy Reddiyar, popularly known as Omandur Ramasamy Reddy, was the Premier of Madras Presidency, from 23 March 1947 to 6 April 1949. Post Independence, the term Province was used until 1950, replacing presidency. His premiership lasted until 6 April 1949, when he resigned citing growing internal squabbled within the then Congress leaders. India won Independence during his tenure.

Kumaraswamy Raja served as Chief Minister of Madras Presidency for two years, (April 1949 to April 1952), until the first general elections were held in the country.

Madras Temple Entry Authorization Act 
The act called for permitting the Dalits into Hindu temples for worship, who was until then were barred from entering the temple. While the former Justice Party, now reemerged as Dravidar Kazhagam headed by Periyar E. V. Ramasamy kept pressing for permitting Dalits into Hindu temples for Worship, the then Congress government under Omandur Ramasamy Reddy would pass the Madras Temple Entry Authorization Act 1947, ratified by the then Governor of Madras on 11 May 1947. This act was intended to give Dalits and other prohibited Hindus full and complete rights to enter Hindu temples.

Devadasi Dedication Abolition Act of 1947 
The Omandur cabinet passed another landmark law related to women, being pressurized by social activists like Muthulakshmi Reddi for a long time. The act known as Madras Devadasis (Prevention of Dedication) Act which gave Devadasi's the legal right to Marry and also making it illegal to dedicate girls to Hindu temples was passed on 9 October 1947 within 2 month of Independence.

P. S. Kumaraswamy Raja

P. S. Kumaraswamy Raja took office on 6 April 1949. He was the first Congress Chief Minister of Madras State after the adaptation of Republican constitution on 26 January 1950. The Madras Province now became Madras State was the administrative area still included present-day Andhra Pradesh, Cochin State and Malabar district of  present-day Kerala and South Canara districts in present-day Karnataka. He stated that the change of the Premier and Members of the Cabinet would not mean a change in the policies of the Government and that his government would follow the same principles of the former Ministry.

Chakravarti Rajagopalachari 
In the 1952 elections, the first as a part of Republic India, the Indian National Congress emerged as the single largest party in the assembly. However, Congress could not form the government as lacked a clear majority, while the Communist Party of India led coalition was in a better position to form the government. Nevertheless, a Congress government was formed in the state, and Chakravarti Rajagopalachari was selected by the cadres of the Congress party to rule the state. Also, Rajaji was not an elected member of the Madras Legislative Assembly but was nominated by the then governor to the Legislative Council and took office as the chief minister of Madras state.

Former Tamil Nadu and Maharashtra governor P. C. Alexander wrote that it was impropriety when former governor Sri Prakasa invited Rajagopalachari to form the government in the Madras state.

Andhra statehood agitation
During this time, freedom fighter Potti Sriramulu called for a separate state for Telugu speaking districts, to be named Andhra, and went on an unconditional fast until his goal was achieved. He died following complications that arose during the fast, and violent riots broke out in the Telugu areas of Madras State including Madras city. Jawaharlal Nehru who initially opposed to the idea of linguistic states, agreed to the demand after the death of Potti Sriramulu,  for a separate state of Andhra. But the demand that Madras city be included in the new state of Andhra was rejected.

It was alleged that Rajaji failed to intervene, either to break the fast or to provide medical help for Sriramulu, even though the fast had continued for over 50 days. On a side note, only one other person, Jatin Das, before Sriramulu, in modern Indian history actually fasted to death. In most cases, they either gave up, were hospitalized or arrested and force fed.
The State of Andhra was carved out of the Madras State in 1953, Rajaji remained aloof from the Andhra State and related issues.

Family vocation education policy
Rajaji also removed controls on foodgrains and introduced a new education policy based on family vocation. According to this policy, students had to go to school in the morning and to compulsorily learn the family vocation practiced by their parents, like carpentry, masonry,  etc. after school. It was severely opposed by Dravidar Kazhagam and DMK as casteist and dubbed Kula Kalvi Thittam (Hereditary Education Policy) by his close friend and political opponent Periyar who vehemently opposed it. This policy was under attack from within the Congress as well as outside it. This ultimately led to his resignation in 1954.

Kamaraj 

On 13 April 1954, K. Kamaraj became the chief minister of Madras State.

Committed to his version of "socialism" meaning that "those who are backward should progress", Kamaraj remained truthful to the simple dictum of his "socialism", providing "what is essential for man's living" such as "dwelling, job, food and education". The great feature of Kamaraj rule was the ending of the retrogressive educational policies and setting the stage for universal and free schooling.

Cabinet reorganisation
One of the first political acts of Kamaraj during his tenure as chief minister was to widen representation of the rising non-Brahmins in the cabinet, yet to everyone's surprise, Kamaraj nominated C. Subramaniam and M. Bhakthavatsalam, who had contested his leadership, 
Ministerial berths were given to other parties like Tamil Nadu Toilers Party and Commonwealth Party. In a move to counter Tamil cultural politics espoused by the DMK, Kamaraj made conscious attempts to partake in the linguistic cultural matters. To placate Tamil aspirations, Kamaraj effected some measures.

Language policy
The efforts towards introducing Tamil language as a medium of instruction in schools and colleges was accompanied by the publication of textbooks on 'scientific and technical subjects' in Tamil. In 1960 the state education minister took steps to introduce Tamil in government arts colleges as a medium of instruction.

Similarly, the usage of Tamil in the courts received encouragement. To affirm his role in the linguistic politics of the state, Kamaraj introduced a bill in February 1962 in the legislative assembly for changing the name of Madras to 'Tamil Nadu' for 'intrastate communication', the bill also proposing Madurai as the capital. But no decision was taken on it. The DMK would later make capital out of this, routing Congress in the 1967 elections four years after Kamaraj relinquished his office as chief minister in accordance with the Kamaraj Plan to concentrate on Congress organizational work.

Education policy
Kamaraj removed the family vocation–based Hereditary Education Policy introduced by Rajaji. Kamaraj strove to eradicate illiteracy by introducing free and compulsory education up to the eleventh standard and introduced the Mid-day Meal Scheme to provide at least one meal per day to the lakhs of poor school children.

Almost every village within a radius of one mile with a population of 300 and above inhabitants was provided with a school. With a view to encouraging and attracting the rural poor children to the schools, Kamaraj pioneered a scheme of free mid-day meals for primary school children in panchayat and government institutions. This scheme, aided by the American voluntary organisation CARE, was launched in 1957. In addition, the government came forward to supply school uniforms to poor students. To make the education easily accessible to children from various backgrounds, full exemption from school fees was introduced. Public enthusiasm and participation in raising funds and procuring equipment for the schools were entertained through different schemes making education a social responsibility. Such measures made education affordable for many who were denied basic educational opportunities for centuries.

Electrification and industrial development
Kamaraj's other feat was his role in facilitating developmental programmes chiefly electrification and industrial development. Thousands of villages were electrified. Rural electrification led to the large-scale use of pumpsets for irrigational purposes and agriculture-received impetus. Major irrigation schemes were planned in Kamaraj's period. Dams and irrigation canals were built across higher Bhavani, Mani Muthar, Aarani, Vaigai, Amaravathi, Sathanur, Krishnagiri, Pullambadi, Parambikulam and Neyyaru among others. The Malapuzha Dam at Palghat District was inaugurated by him as Chief Minister in 1955 (before Kerala was formed as a separate state in 1956). Large- and small-scale industries were flagged off generating employment opportunities. Kamaraj made the best use of the funds available through the Five-Year Plans and guided Tamil Nadu in deriving the maximum benefit.

M. Bhaktavatsalam  
In 1962, the Indian National Congress won the Madras state elections and formed the government in the state for the fifth time in 25 years. Kamaraj became Chief Minister. It was his third tenure as Chief Minister (3 March 1962 – 2 October 1963). Later Kamaraj resigned his Chief Ministership to work for the Congress Party under the "KAMARAJ PLAN", wherein senior leaders were invited to do party work. Hence on 2 October 1963, Bhaktavatsalam took office as the chief minister of Madras as Kamaraj desired to spend more time serving the party. Bhaktavatsalam is, until date, the last Chief Minister of Madras from the Indian National Congress.

Anti-Hindi agitation

Bhaktavatsalam's tenure as chief minister witnessed severe anti-Hindi agitations in Madras state. Bhaktavatsalam supported the Union Government's decision to introduce Hindi as compulsory language and rejected the demands to make Tamil the medium of instruction in colleges, saying that it was "not a practical proposition, not in the interests of national integration, not in the interests of higher education, and not in the interests of the students themselves". On 7 March 1964, at a session of the Madras Legislative Assembly, Bhaktavatsalam recommended the introduction of a three-language formula comprising English, Hindi and Tamil.

As 26 January 1965, the day when the 15-year-long transition period recommended by the Indian Parliament came to an end, neared, the agitations intensified, leading to police action and casualties. Five of the agitators (Sivalingam, Aranganathan, Veerappan, Mutthu, and Sarangapani) immolated themselves while three others (Dandapani, Mutthu, and Shanmugam) consumed poison. One of the agitators, eighteen-year-old Rajendran, was killed on 27 January 1965 as a result of police firing.

On 13 February 1965, Bhaktavatsalam claimed that the opposition Dravida Munnetra Kazhagam and the Left parties were responsible for the large-scale destruction of public property and violence during the anti-Hindi agitations of 1965.

C. N. Annadurai 
In 1967, the DMK (Dravida Munnetra Kazhagam) party, born from Dravidar Kazhagam in 1949, won with thumping majority with the Congress losing elections in nine states to opposition parties, but it was only in Madras State that a single non-Congress party majority was achieved. The electoral victory of 1967 is also due to an electoral fusion among the non-Congress parties to avoid a split in the Opposition votes. The former Congress leader Rajagopalachari, had by then left the Congress to found the right-wing Swatantra Party. At that time, his cabinet was the youngest in the country.

Marriage Act
C. N. Annadurai legalised self-respect marriages for the first time in the country.
 These ceremonies did not require any  priest to carry out the ceremonies.

Food Policy
Annadurai was the first to announce subsidising of the price of rice in the election manifesto. He promised a measure of rice for one rupee, which he initially implemented but withdrew soon. Subsidizing rice and giving freebies are still used as election promises in Tamil Nadu.

Renaming of the state
It was Annadurai's government that renamed the Madras State to Tamil Nadu. With Annadurai as chief minister, the state assembly passed the bill of renaming the state successfully. It was during the period of his Chief Ministership that the Second World Tamil Conference was conducted on a grand scale on 3 January 1968. Also, when a commemorative stamp was released to mark the Tamil conference, Annadurai expressed his dissatisfaction that the stamp contained Hindi when it was for Tamil.

Golden Jubilee celebration for State's renaming as Tamil Nadu
Tamil Nadu Government has decided to celebrate the Golden Jubilee on 14 January 2018 to mark the renaming of the erstwhile 'Madras State'. It was decided to observe the golden jubilee with events to mark the eminence of Tamil language and Tamil people, and by honouring young Tamil research scholars at the valedictory.

See also 
 Madras Presidency
 Tamil Nadu
 History of Tamil Nadu
 List of Chief Ministers of Tamil Nadu
 Andhra Pradesh
 Kerala
 Karnataka

References 

 Government of Tamil Nadu – Tamil Nadu Secretariat – Brief History

Former states and territories of India
History of Tamil Nadu (1947–present)
1950 establishments in India
1969 disestablishments in India